The 1982–83 Nationale A season was the 62nd season of the Nationale A, the top level of ice hockey in France. 12 teams participated in the league, and Sporting Hockey Club Saint Gervais won their fourth league title. Club des patineurs lyonnais was relegated to the Nationale B.

First round

Final round

Relegation

External links
Season on hockeyarchives.info

Fra
1982–83 in French ice hockey
Ligue Magnus seasons